Thomas Worrall Casey (13 October 1869 – 29 November 1949) was a British Liberal politician and Trade Union leader.

Background
He was born in the Intake district of Sheffield, as the son of William and Jemima Ann Casey. He was educated at Gleadless Church School. He was married in 1894. He had two sons and three daughters. In 1916 his eldest son was killed in the First World War, Alphius. His memorial can be found in Thiepval in the Lancaster regiment.

Trade Unionism
He started work at 12 years of age on a farm. At 13 he went to work at Birley Colliery, near Sheffield, where he remained until 18 years of age. He was employed at this time as an engineman. He left and started at Cadeby Colliery, near Rotherham, as a winding engineman, and remained there for 24 years. On leaving he was presented with a Gold Hunter Watch by workmen and officials. He was elected as the General Secretary of the National Winding and General Engineers' Society, serving for 25 years.

Politics
At the 1918 general election, Casey was elected for the Sheffield Attercliffe constituency. He benefitted from being endorsed by Prime Minister David Lloyd George. 

In parliament, he joined Lloyd George's Liberal group that was to form itself into the National Liberal Party. 
He lost his seat at the 1922 general election.  

Following Liberal reunion in 1923 he contested Ilkeston in 1923,

He then moved to contest Gloucester in 1929 as a Liberal.
He finally fought Rotherham in 1935 as a Liberal National. 

With this final loss, he gave up on Parliamentary politics. He was elected to Mexborough Urban District Council. He was a Justice of the Peace in the city of Sheffield. He was a Methodist lay preacher for 60 years.

He died in Sheffield aged 80.

References

 Michael Stenton and Stephen Lees, Who's Who of British MPs: Volume III, 1919–1945

External links 
 

1869 births
1949 deaths
Members of the Parliament of the United Kingdom for English constituencies
People from Sheffield
Politicians from Yorkshire
UK MPs 1918–1922
Liberal Party (UK) MPs for English constituencies
National Liberal Party (UK, 1922) politicians
National Liberal Party (UK, 1931) politicians